Mon Bole Priya Priya is a 2011 Bengali film directed by Milan Bhowmik. This is a romantic film. According to director Milan Bhowmik– "It’s a love story on the extremes that true love can push one to."

Plot
Arjun (Raaj) travels to the city to seek admission in a college. Rich girl Priya (Pamela) is gifted a car without brakes by her uncle. Priya runs the car over Arjun and Arjun loses his memory. Priya feels sad for Arjun and romance begins to brew between the two. Ashish Vidyarthi plays the role of a good cop.

Cast
Raaj Bhowmik as Arjun
Pamela as Priya
Tapas Paul
Ashish Vidyarthi
Rajatava Dutta
Rita Koiral
Subhasish Mukherjee

Songs
"Kono Badha" – Sushati
"Mon Bole Priya Priya" – Aneek Dhar & Somchandra
"Tumi Ele Jibone" – Aneek & Anwesha
"Ei Je Mati" – Aneek & Somchandra
"Mon Bole Priya Priya" (Sad) – Aneek
"Mon Bole Priya Priya" – Instrumental

References

External links

2011 films
Bengali-language Indian films
2010s Bengali-language films